Garo Paylan (born 1972) is a Turkish politician of Armenian descent. He is a Member of the Grand National Assembly of Turkey for the Peoples' Democratic Party (HDP) representing Diyarbakır. He became one of the first Armenian members of Turkey's parliament in decades alongside Markar Esayan (AKP) and Selina Özuzun Doğan (CHP).

Life
Garo Paylan was born in Istanbul, Turkey in 1972 to an Armenian family originally from Malatya. He graduated from Istanbul University's School of Business. He then became a director of various Armenian schools in Istanbul. Thereafter, he became a director for a project that promoted multilingual education.

Political career
Garo Paylan first joined the Peace and Democracy Party (BDP) in 2011 and was one of its campaign supports. He then represented the interests of Armenians within the party and soon joined other activists starting the People's Democratic Congress, becoming a member of its Central committee.

Peoples' Democratic Party
Garo Paylan became one of the founding members of the Peoples' Democratic Party (HDP) and was part of its central committee.

Member of Parliament
On June 7, 2015, he was elected into the Grand National Assembly as a representative of Istanbul's 3rd electoral district. He became among the first Armenian members of the Assembly in decades alongside Selina Özuzun Doğan (CHP) and Markar Esayan (AKP). He was re-elected in the snap elections of November 2015.

He was re-elected to the Grand National Assembly of Turkey in the Parliamentary Elections on 24 June 2018. He is currently a member of the Turkish parliament's Planning and Budget Committee. The State Prosecutor for the Court of Cassation in Turkey Bekir Şahin filed a lawsuit before the Constitutional Court on the 17 March 2021, demanding for Paylan and 686 other HDP politicians a five-year ban for a political participation. The lawsuit was filed jointly with a request for the HDP to be shut down due to the parties alleged organizational links with the Kurdistan Workers' Party (PKK).

Brawl in parliament
On 2 May 2016, another fight occurred during a meeting for constitutional reform in which the Minister of Justice, Bekir Bozdağ, blamed Garo Paylan for starting the fight the previous week. Paylan responded by saying Bozdağ's remarks were slanderous. Following the incident, Paylan said that many racist remarks were made about his Armenian identity and that the attack against him was planned. He concluded that he was attacked because of his ethnic Armenian identity.

The Human Rights Association of Turkey released a statement condemning the violence against Paylan. The condemnation, released by its Committee Against Racism and Discrimination, stated that the attacks against him were due to his Armenian origin. The statement also condemned various racial slurs that were said to him such as "the Armenian bastard".

Views

Armenian Genocide
Upon getting elected Paylan vowed to fight against Armenian genocide denial and demands that the Armenian genocide be acknowledged in Turkey. In April 2016, during a speech in parliament he made concerning the 101st anniversary of the Armenian Genocide, Paylan counted the names of Ottoman Armenian politicians who were deported and killed during the Armenian Genocide. In April 2021, he demanded the same acknowledgement of the Armenian genocide by Turkey in a speech in the Turkish parliament. Paylan also opposes the calling streets of squares in memory of Talaat Pasha, equating it to calling streets in Germany in memory of Adolf Hitler.

Armenia and Artsakh
During the war in Nagorno Karabakh in 2020, he criticized the Turkish Government of the Justice and Development Party (AKP) for being in favor of war while being a member of the Minsk Group which is tasked with finding a diplomatic solution for the conflict.

Police violence
He supports the movement of the Saturday Mothers, who demand answers to the whereabouts of their "disappeared" relatives  in Turkey.

LGBTQ+ rights
On 1 November 2022, during Pink Armenia's "2022 Rainbow Forum" in Yerevan, Paylan made an impromptu visit after meeting Armenia's prime minister Nikol Pashinyan earlier that day. Paylan stated, "If Armenia wants to be a democratic country, it should respect LGBTIQ rights".

Awards
Grand Vermeil Medal
Yerevan State University’s gold medal
Nobel Prize for Peace nominations (2018, 2020).

See also
Armenians in Turkey
Hrant Dink
Racism in Turkey

External links

References

1972 births
Istanbul University alumni
Schoolteachers from Istanbul
Armenian educators
Members of the 25th Parliament of Turkey
Members of the 26th Parliament of Turkey
Living people
Peoples' Democratic Party (Turkey) politicians
Armenian politicians
Turkish people of Armenian descent
Turkish Oriental Orthodox Christians
Armenian Apostolic Christians
Deputies of Istanbul
Members of the 27th Parliament of Turkey
Ethnic Armenian politicians
Turkish human rights activists